The White Collar (Tetri sakelo) is a novel by Georgian novelist Mikheil Javakhishvili. It was first published in magazine Mnatobi (in 1926). During his life, it was published several times. This novel, which depicts social problems in the early 20th century of Khevsureti, in the north part of Georgia, is reputed to be a magnum opus of the author.

References

 Novel - Goodreads.com

Literature of Georgia (country)
1926 novels
20th-century Georgian novels
Novels by Mikheil Javakhishvili
Philosophical novels